Breaking Upwards is a 2009 American romantic comedy-drama film directed by Daryl Wein, starring Zoe Lister-Jones, Wein, Julie White, Peter Friedman, Andrea Martin, and Pablo Schreiber. It explores a 20-something, real-life New York couple battling codependency who intricately strategize their own break-up. Cited as an example of independent film industry sweat equity, the film was shot in Manhattan and Brooklyn on a $15,000 budget. It premiered at the SXSW Film Festival on March 14, 2009, and was released simultaneously at New York City's IFC Center and via video on demand on April 2, 2010.

Cast

Festival screenings
South by Southwest Film Festival (USA; March 2009)
Brooklyn International Film Festival (USA; June 5, 2009) 
Athens Film Festival (under title, Doseis horismou) (Greece; September 19, 2009) 
Titanic International Filmpresence Festival (under title, Szép kis szakítás) (Hungary; April 11, 2010) 
Leiden International Film Festival (Netherlands; October 26, 2010)

References

External links
 
 
 
 Breaking Upwards at IFC Films
 The New York Times review
Los Angeles Times review
 Women's Wear Daily cover story

2009 films
2009 independent films
2009 romantic comedy-drama films
American independent films
American romantic comedy-drama films
Films about couples
Films set in New York City
Films shot in New York City
2000s English-language films
2000s American films